Areka City Football Club (Amharic: አረካ ከነማ እግር ኳስ ክለብ) is an Ethiopian club based in Areka. Areka City F.C. was officially established in 2000. They are a member of the Ethiopian Football Federation and play in the Ethiopian First League, the third division of Ethiopian football.

Honors
In the 2021/22 Ethiopian First League, Areka F.C. was assigned to group C, in which the competition was completed on Friday, April 8, 2022, in Burayu. The team ended with a total of 37 points in the competition, and Areka F.C. triumphed in the Ethiopian first League's Group C.

Stadium 
The club plays its home matches at Areka Stadium in Areka, Ethiopia.

References

Football clubs in Ethiopia
Wolayita
Sport in Wolayita Zone
Sport in the Southern Nations, Nationalities, and Peoples' Region